The Deficit Reduction Act may refer to various pieces of United States legislation, including:
 Deficit Reduction Act of 1984
 Gramm-Rudman-Hollings Deficit Reduction Act of 1985
 Omnibus Budget Reconciliation Act of 1993
 Deficit Reduction Act of 2005

See also
 Deficit (disambiguation)